Major General Sir Donald Johnstone McGavin  (19 August 1876 – 8 May 1960) was a New Zealand surgeon, army health administrator and medical administrator. He was born in Chatham, Kent, England. He qualified as a Doctor of Medicine in 1901.

Johnstone then joined the Royal Army Medical Corps as a civilian surgeon, serving in Natal during the Boer War. He then moved to New Zealand and started practicing as a surgeon in Wellington, and later became a volunteer medical officer, serving in World War I. Following the war, he served as Director-General of Medical Services from 1919 to 1924, and as a medical advisor to the Minister of Defence during World War II. 

In the 1919 New Year Honours, McGavin was made an additional Companion of the Order of St Michael and St George. He was appointed a Knight Bachelor in the 1921 King's Birthday Honours. In 1935, he was awarded the King George V Silver Jubilee Medal. In 1946 he was appointed as a Commander of the Order of St John.

References

1876 births
1960 deaths
New Zealand military personnel
New Zealand surgeons
New Zealand Knights Bachelor
New Zealand Companions of the Order of St Michael and St George
New Zealand Companions of the Distinguished Service Order
People from Chatham, Kent
English emigrants to New Zealand
New Zealand medical administrators